Garnheath distillery was a Scotch whisky grain distillery founded in 1964, with distillation commencing in February 1965.

The Garnheath Distillery was closed and demolished by Inver House Distillers Limited in July 1986.

References

British companies established in 1964
British companies disestablished in 1986
Distilleries in Scotland
1964 establishments in Scotland
1986 disestablishments in Scotland